The Clearwater Hearings were a 1982 Clearwater, Florida commission that investigated the Church of Scientology and Project Normandy. Among the witnesses who testified were Ron DeWolf and various ex-Scientologists. The commission uncovered a number of illegal activities committed by the church, including:

 murder of Susan Meister
 having Tonja Burden, as a minor, sign promissory notes to the church
 negligence and abuse of children 
 theft of government documents
 forging of government ID cards
 giving money to its founder, L. Ron Hubbard
 harassment of reporters and alleged attackers
 harboring of fugitive Mike Meisner
 perjury in federal courts

The commission likewise found unethical activities committed by the church, including:

 lying about the ends and benefits of auditing
 fabrication of L. Ron Hubbard's life
 forging of evidence for Hubbard's life
 unsanitary living conditions for Scientologists 
 abortions by beating women in the stomach
 using a front to buy Fort Harrison
 false witness against alleged attackers
 "widespread, intercontinental espionage"
 justifying all the aforementioned as religion

Finally, the commission found the following about L. Ron Hubbard:
 had suicidal thoughts after leaving the Navy
 continuously wrote to the FBI about alleged Communist plots against him
 refused to get help for his mental illness 
 wrote to a magazine posing as a woman
 married three times, and one time practiced polygamy
 abused and performed pseudoscientific experiments on Sara Hubbard
 performed abortions by beating women in their stomachs
 surrounded himself with very young girls who did his every whim
 founded Scientology to make money for himself
 made extravagant purchases and lacked personal management  
 was obsessed with blood while making movies

References
 

 

Scientology and law